Claire Whitney (May 6, 1890 – August 27, 1969) was an American stage and film actress who appeared in 111 films between 1912 and 1949. Only 21 of these films survive, as most have been lost.

Whitney gained early acting experience with a stock theater company in Massachusetts, following which she toured the United States in a vaudeville production of Little Mother.

Whitney made her first film in 1913 for Solax and continued making films until 1921, mainly for Fox Film Corporation. Whitney came back to films in 1926 with a role in The Great Gatsby which would be her final silent film.  She continued working in film between 1931 and 1949 when she retired.

Whitney's Broadway credits include Broadway Interlude (1934), Page Pygmalion (1932), An Innocent Idea (1920), and The Net (1919).

On March 20, 1920, Whitney's marriage to Jan von Hoegarden, an actor also known as John Sunderland, was annulled after he admitted having a wife and children in Belgium. The couple had wed on November 12, 1917, in New York.

Whitney died in Los Angeles on August 27, 1969, at the age of 79. She is buried in an unmarked grave in Forest Lawn Memorial Park, next to her husband, Robert Emmett Keane.

Selected filmography

References

External links

1890 births
1969 deaths
American film actresses
American silent film actresses
American stage actresses
Burials at Forest Lawn Memorial Park (Hollywood Hills)
20th-century American actresses
Actresses from New York City